Pa. Subramania Mudaliar was a renowned 19th-century poet from Vellakal, Tirunelveli District, India. He wrote a number of Tamil books including Kombi virutham, Akaligai venba, and a book on Tamil literature. He also pioneered the translation of veterinary texts from English into Tamil.

References

Tamil scholars
Tamil poets
Year of death missing
Year of birth missing
Indian male poets
Poets from Tamil Nadu